The UP Warriorz are an Indian women's cricket team that compete in the Women's Premier League (WPL), based in Lucknow, Uttar Pradesh. The team is owned by Capri Global. The team is coached by Jon Lewis and captained by Alyssa Healy. Their squad was assembled at the inaugural WPL player auction in February 2023.

History
In October 2022, the BCCI announced its intentions to hold a five-team women's franchise cricket tournament in March 2023. The tournament was named the Women's Premier League in January 2023, with investors buying the rights to franchises through a closed bidding process during the same month. Capri Global bought the rights to one of the franchises, to be based in Lucknow, Uttar Pradesh.

In February 2023, Jon Lewis was announced as head coach of the side. The inaugural player auction for the WPL was held on 13 February 2023, with UP Warriorz signing 16 players for their squad.

Current squad
As per 2023 season. Players in bold have international caps.  denotes a player who is unavailable for the rest of the season.

Support Staff

Source: ESPNCricinfo

Kit manufacturers and sponsors

References

Cricket clubs established in 2023
Women's Premier League (cricket) teams